Grégory Nicot (born September 14, 1982) is a French former professional footballer who played as a striker.

He played professionally in Ligue 2 for Nîmes Olympique, and had a lengthy career at the lower levels of French football.

References

1982 births
Living people
People from Bron
French footballers
Association football forwards
Nîmes Olympique players
US Albi players
FC Martigues players
R.E. Virton players
Moulins Yzeure Foot players
Trélissac FC players
Genêts Anglet players
Lyon La Duchère players
GOAL FC players
Ligue 2 players
French expatriate footballers
Expatriate footballers in Belgium
Sportspeople from Lyon Metropolis
Footballers from Auvergne-Rhône-Alpes